The Idyllic school (also known as the Idyllists) was a 19th-century art movement of British artists—both painters and illustrators—whose depictions of rural landscapes combined elements of social realism and idealism. Van Gogh's well-known admiration for the group was shown in letters to his brother Theo, and in his collection of their work extracted from contemporary British newspapers, such as the Illustrated London News and The Graphic. Nowadays the Idyllist school is seen as one of the earliest manifestation of the social realism movement in art

List of idyllist artists

John William North ARA RWS
Frederick Walker ARA RWS
George John Pinwell RWS
Robert Walker Macbeth RA RWS
George Hemming Mason ARA
Arthur Boyd Houghton 
Hubert von Herkomer RA
Richard Jefferies (writer)

See also

Helen Allingham RWS
George Clausen
Alice Mary Havers
Lionel Smythe

References

Further reading

Paul Goldman, Victorian Illustration: The Pre-Raphaelites, the Idyllic School and the High Victorians (Lund Humphries, 1996)
Donato Esposito, Frederick Walker and the Idyllists (London: Lund Humphries, 2017)
Scott Wilcox and Christopher Newall, Victorian Landscape Watercolours (Hudson Hills, 1992), p. 55.

External links

The Idyllists

British art movements